The compound of five truncated tetrahedra is a uniform polyhedron compound. It's composed of 5 truncated tetrahedra rotated around a common axis. It may be formed by truncating each of the tetrahedra in the compound of five tetrahedra. A far-enough truncation creates the compound of five octahedra. Its convex hull is a nonuniform snub dodecahedron.

Cartesian coordinates 
Cartesian coordinates for the vertices of this compound are all the cyclic permutations of

 (±1, ±1, ±3)
 (±τ−1, ±(−τ−2), ±2τ)
 (±τ, ±(−2τ−1), ±τ2)
 (±τ2, ±(−τ−2), ±2)
 (±(2τ−1), ±1, ±(2τ − 1))

with an even number of minuses in the choices for '±', where τ = (1+)/2 is the golden ratio (sometimes written φ).

References 
.

Polyhedral compounds